Oscar Nobua (born 28 January 1949) is an Argentine weightlifter. He competed in the men's middle heavyweight event at the 1968 Summer Olympics.

References

External links
 

1949 births
Living people
Argentine male weightlifters
Olympic weightlifters of Argentina
Weightlifters at the 1968 Summer Olympics
People from Burzaco
Sportspeople from Buenos Aires Province
20th-century Argentine people